Kashkamir (also Romanized as Kashkamīr; also known as Kashkamīr-e Pā’īn, Kashkamīr-e Soflá, and Kashkeh Mīr-e Soflá) is a village in Kivanat Rural District, Kolyai District, Sonqor County, Kermanshah Province, Iran. At the 2006 census, its population was 96, in 22 families.

References 

Populated places in Sonqor County